Bajofondo Tango Club is an electronica music album by Bajofondo released in 2002 by Vibra Records. It is considered to be an eclectic mix of French house, Argentine tango, trip-hop, drum and bass and chill-out.

Overview
The band's first album, Bajofondo Tango Club won a Latin Grammy for Best Pop Instrumental Album, though it is not without vocals. It uses samples of tango stars such as Roberto Goyeneche and Susana Rinaldi mixed with modern counterparts like Cristobal Repetto and Adriana Varela. As the producers intended, the digital rhythms of house, drum 'n' bass and trip-hop mix with the sounds of conventional acoustic tango instruments like the bandoneon, the piano and tortured violin melodies.

According to the BBC, Bajofondo has produced "something new which is at the same time respectful of tradition", and "earned the admiration of a wide and growing audience, both at home and abroad".

Track listing
 "Montserrat" by Orquesta del Plata – 5:10
 "En mí / Soledad" by Campo – 4:07
 "Los Tangueros" by Orquesta del Plata - 5:12
 "Mi Corazón" by Campo – 4:24
 "Maroma" by Emilio Kauderer – 4:44
 "Perfume" by Luciano Supervielle, remixed by Campo – 5:26
 "Vacío" by Didi Gutman – 2:48
 "Esperándote" by Gustavo Santaolalla – 4:13
 "Naranjo En Flor" by Campo featuring Verónica Loza – 4:38
 "Bruma" by Gustavo Santaolalla – 6:13
 "Éxodo II"  by Juan Blas Caballero – 5:15
 "Duro y Parejo" by Gustavo Santaolalla - 5:26
 "Forma" by Luciano Supervielle - 3:54
 "El Sonido de la Milonga" by Campo - 5:33
 "Av. de Mayo" by Diego Vainer|Diego Vainer Fantasías Animadas - 5:42
 "Ese Cielo Azul" by Luciano Supervielle - 6:05 bonus track

External links

2002 albums
Electronica albums
Bajofondo albums
Latin Grammy Award for Best Instrumental Album